A neo-pagan is an adherent of modern paganism.

Neo-pagan or neopagan may also refer to:

Neopagan, a 2006 album by Paolo Rustichelli

See also